The 1890 Pittsburgh Burghers baseball team was a member of the short-lived Players' League. They compiled a 60–68 record, good for sixth place. After the season, the league folded, and the Burghers were bought out by their National League counterpart.

Regular season

Season standings

Record vs. opponents

Roster

Player stats

Batting

Starters by position 
Note: Pos = Position; G = Games played; AB = At bats; H = Hits; Avg. = Batting average; HR = Home runs; RBI = Runs batted in

Other batters 
Note: G = Games played; AB = At bats; H = Hits; Avg. = Batting average; HR = Home runs; RBI = Runs batted in

Pitching

Starting pitchers 
Note: G = Games pitched; IP = Innings pitched; W = Wins; L = Losses; ERA = Earned run average; SO = Strikeouts

Relief pitchers 
Note: G = Games pitched; W = Wins; L = Losses; SV = Saves; ERA = Earned run average; SO = Strikeouts

References 
1890 Pittsburgh Burghers (PL) season at Baseball Reference

Pittsburgh Burghers season
Pittsburgh Burghers
Baseball in Pennsylvania